The Farmington River Railroad Bridge spans the Farmington River in Windsor, Connecticut, just west of Palisado Avenue and north of Pleasant Street.  It carries two tracks of the main railroad line between Hartford, Connecticut and Springfield, Massachusetts.  Built in 1867, it is one of the state's finest examples of a stone arch railroad bridge.  It was listed on the National Register of Historic Places in 1972.

Description and history
The Farmington River Railroad Bridge is located north of the village center of Windsor, spanning the east-flowing Farmington River in a north–south direction, just north of Pleasant Street. The stone is formed into dressed rectangular blocks of varying sizes. The sides of the piers are articulated as pilasters, with a captstone set on a stone balustrade over each one. The upstream sides of the piers have triangular projections to minimize damage caused by ice floes.

The bridge was built in 1867 by the Hartford and New Haven Railroad, and has carried the main line between Hartford and Springfield since then.  This is particularly noteworthy, because the weight and force of modern trains is substantially greater than those at the time of its construction.  The bridge was designed to allow for the transit of barges beneath it on the river.

See also
National Register of Historic Places listings in Windsor, Connecticut
List of bridges on the National Register of Historic Places in Connecticut

References

Bridges on the National Register of Historic Places in Connecticut
National Register of Historic Places in Hartford County, Connecticut
Bridges completed in 1867
Bridges in Hartford County, Connecticut
Windsor, Connecticut
Stone arch bridges in the United States
Railroad bridges in Connecticut